Gundam Gaiden II is a video game developed and published by Bandai for the Sega Saturn.

Gameplay
Gundam Gaiden II is a game with missions that include destroy or protect, and simple escorts.

Reception
Next Generation reviewed the Saturn version of the game, rating it three stars out of five, and stated that "Gundam Gaiden II is more an expansion pack rather than a separate game, and it should be considered as such. In that light, the game's slight graphical improvement but expanded mission goals and AI make it a welcome, if not fantastic, addition to the Saturn game library."

References

Gundam video games
Japan-exclusive video games
Sega Saturn games
Sega Saturn-only games
Video games developed in Japan